The 2016 Ronde van Drenthe was the 10th running of the women's Ronde van Drenthe, a women's bicycle race in the Netherlands.

Results

References

Ronde van Drenthe (women's race)
Ronde van Drenthe
Ronde van Drenthe